Acord is a surname. Notable people with the surname include:

Art Acord (1890–1931), American silent film actor and rodeo champion
Bobby R. Acord, American government official
David Acord, American sound editor and voice actor
Lance Acord (born 1964), American cinematographer

See also
Accord (disambiguation)
ACORD